Vilkomir may refer to:

 Vilkomir (aka Ukmergė), a city in Vilnius County, Lithuania
 Battle of Vilkomir (1435, aka Battle of Wilkomierz)

People
 Sergiy Vilkomir (1957–2020), Ukrainian computer scientist

See also
 Charles Frank (1865—1959, born in Vilkomir), Scottish optical and scientific instrument maker